The Norway Bridge near Mayville, North Dakota is a Pratt pony truss structure that was built in 1912 over the Goose River.  It was listed on the National Register of Historic Places in 1997.

References

Road bridges on the National Register of Historic Places in North Dakota
Bridges completed in 1912
Transportation in Traill County, North Dakota
1912 establishments in North Dakota
National Register of Historic Places in Traill County, North Dakota
Pratt truss bridges in the United States
Bridges over the Goose River (North Dakota)